This is a list of Cypriot football transfers for the 2017–18 summer transfer window by club. Only transfers of clubs in the Cypriot First Division and Cypriot Second Division are included.

Cypriot First Division

Note: Flags indicate national team as has been defined under FIFA eligibility rules. Players may hold more than one non-FIFA nationality.

AEK Larnaca

In:

Out:

AEL Limassol

In:

Out:

Alki Oroklini

In:

Out:

Anorthosis Famagusta

In:

Out:

APOEL

In:

Out:

Apollon Limassol

In:

Out:

Aris Limassol

In:

Out:

Doxa Katokopias

In:

Out:

Ermis Aradippou

In:

Out:

Ethnikos Achna

In:

Out:

Nea Salamina

In:

Out:

Olympiakos Nicosia

In:

Out:

Omonia

In:

Out:

Pafos

In:

Out:

Cypriot Second Division

AEZ Zakakiou

In:

Out:

Anagennisi Deryneia

In:

Out:

ASIL

In:

Out:

Ayia Napa

In:

Out:

Chalkanoras Idaliou

In:

Out:

Digenis Oroklinis

In:

Out:

Enosis Neon Paralimni

In:

Out:

Ethnikos Assia

In:

Out:

Karmiotissa

In:

Out:

Omonia Aradippou

In:

Out:

Othellos Athienou

In:

Out:

PAEEK

In:

Out:

P.O. Xylotymbou

In:

Out:

THOI Lakatamia

In:

Out:

References

Football transfers summer 2017
Trans
Cypriot football transfers